{{Infobox officeholder 
| name                =Linus Bacon Comins 
| image               =Linus B. Comins, Massachusetts Congressman.jpg
| state               =Massachusetts
| district            =4th
| term_start          =March 4, 1855
| term_end            =March 3, 1859
| preceded            =Samuel H. Walley
| succeeded           =Alexander H. Rice
|order4=City of Roxbury, Massachusetts, Member of the Common CouncilWard 5
|term_start4=1846
|term_end4=1848
|predecessor4=None
|successor4=Aaron D. Williams, Jr.
|order3= City of Roxbury, Massachusetts, President of the Common Council
|term_start3=1847
|term_end3=1848
|predecessor3=Francis G. Shaw
|successor3=William A. Crafts
|order2=4th Mayor of Roxbury, Massachusetts
|term_start2=1854
|term_end2=1854
|predecessor2= Samuel Walker
|successor2= James Ritchie
| birth_date          =November 29, 1817
| birth_place         =Charlton, Massachusetts
| death_date          =October 14, 1892 (aged 75)
| death_place         =Jamaica Plain, Massachusetts
| restingplace=Forest Hills Cemetery, Boston, Massachusetts
| nationality         =
| party               =American Party, Republican
| spouse              =Mary Barker  
| relations           =
| children            =
| residence           =
| alma_mater          =
| occupation          =
| profession          =
| religion            =
| signature           =
| website             =
| footnotes           =
}}Linus Bacon Comins' (November 29, 1817 – October 14, 1892) was a Massachusetts politician who served as Mayor of Roxbury, Massachusetts and as a member of the United States House of Representatives from Massachusetts from 1855 to 1859.

Early life
Comins, the son of Mary (Bacon) Comins and Barnabus C. Comins, was born in Charlton, Massachusetts.

Comins attended the common schools at Brookfield, Massachusetts and was graduated from Worcester County Manual Training High School.  He engaged in manufacturing in Roxbury, Massachusetts.

Political career
Comins was a member of the Roxbury city council from 1846 to 1848 and served as its president in 1847 and 1848.  He was the Mayor of Roxbury in 1854.  He was elected as a candidate of the American Party to the Thirty-fourth Congress, March 4, 1855 - March 3, 1857, and as a Republican to the Thirty-fifth Congress (March 4, 1857 – March 3, 1859).

Retirement
After leaving Congress, he resumed manufacturing pursuits.  He was a delegate to the Republican National Convention, 1860.

Death and burial
Comins died in Jamaica Plain, Massachusetts, October 14, 1892, and was interred at Forest Hills Cemetery in Jamaica Plain.

 References 

BibliographyA Catalogue of the City Councils of Boston, 1822-1908, Roxbury, 1846-1867, Charlestown 1847-1873 and of The Selectmen of Boston, 1634-1822 also of Various Other Town and Municipal officers, Boston, MA: City of Boston Printing Department, (1909) pp. 328–329.
Thwing, Walter Eliot (1908), History of the First Church in Roxbury, Massachusetts, 1630-1904'', Boston, MA: W.A. Butterfield, (1908) p. 331.

External links
 

People from Charlton, Massachusetts
Massachusetts city council members
1817 births
1892 deaths
Mayors of Roxbury, Massachusetts
Know-Nothing members of the United States House of Representatives from Massachusetts
Republican Party members of the United States House of Representatives from Massachusetts
19th-century American politicians